John Shalloo (27 May 1886 – 14 June 1932) was an Irish hurler. As a full-back, he played with local club O'Callaghan's Mills and was a member of the Clare senior hurling team that won the 1914 All-Ireland Championship.

Honours

O'Callaghan's Mills
Clare Senior Hurling Championship: 1904, 1906, 1909, 1910, 1918

Clare
All-Ireland Senior Hurling Championship: 1914
Munster Senior Hurling Championship: 1914

References

1886 births
1932 deaths
O'Callaghan's Mills hurlers
Cork inter-county hurlers